Kamienica Łyszkiewicza w Warszawie (the Łyszkiewicz apartment building) is a museum (birthplace of Maria Skłodowska Curie), established 1967, in the Warsaw New Town district, Poland.

External links
Official site

Museums in Warsaw
Museums established in 1967
Biographical museums in Poland